Goldfeld is a Jewish East European surname, common among Ashkenazi Jews. Its meaning is 'gold field'.

Notable people with the surname incclude:
 Dorian M. Goldfeld (born 1947), American mathematician
 Ester Goldfeld (born 1993), American tennis player
 Stephen Goldfeld (1940–1995), American economist

See also 
 Goldfield (disambiguation)
 Goldberg (disambiguation)

Jewish surnames
German-language surnames
Yiddish-language surnames